Stenodrepanum bergii is a species of flowering plants in the legume family, Fabaceae. It belongs to the subfamily Caesalpinioideae. It is native to Argentina.

References

Caesalpinieae
Monotypic Fabaceae genera